"The Road Not Taken" is a science fiction short story by American writer Harry Turtledove, set in 2039, in which he presents a fictitious account of a first encounter between humanity and an alien race, the Roxolani.   Turtledove wrote a sequel, a short story entitled "Herbig-Haro".

Plot summary
The story is told through limited third person point of view, with most of the story concerning a single Roxolani captain, Togram. During a routine journey of conquest, they happen upon Earth. The Roxolani anticipate a simple and rewarding campaign, as they can detect no use of gravity manipulation, the cornerstone of their civilization. Humanity is awed by the invaders, as the maneuverability granted by that technology suggests the rest of their civilization is equally impressive. But as they begin their assault, things take a turn for the absurdthe Roxolani attack with matchlock weapons and black powder explosives. Humans retaliate with automatic weapons and missiles. The battle is short, and most of the invaders are killed. A few are captured alive.

When they are interrogated, the truth becomes evident: the method of manipulating gravity is absurdly simple, and species like the Roxolani are thus able to use faster than light travel with relatively primitive technological sophistication. This enabled them to engage in wars of conquest on a galactic scale. However, adopting the technology allowing for interstellar travel (and wars of conquest on a galactic scale) stifles further technological development as all the creative energies of societies that find it go into perfecting it. In contrast, humanity somehow missed developing gravity technology and advanced further technologically. Unlike the broad reaching implications of the technology that Earth has developed, the gravity manipulation has no other uses.
 
As Togram and another Roxolani captive realize that they have now given a far more advanced civilization the means to travel to countless worlds, the story closes with the two asking themselves, "What have we done?"

Publication history
The story was first published in Analog Science Fiction in 1985. It is a prequel story to "Herbig-Haro"set several centuries after humanity has conquered the Orion Arm of the Milky Way published a year before under the name "Eric Iverson".

This short story contains ideas which were later more developed in the Worldwar series, in which the invading aliens have an initial technological edge that is soon surpassed by human ingenuity and innovation.

References

Kaleidoscope, Harry Turtledove, Ballantine Books, April 1990, 

1985 short stories
Fiction set in 2039
Alien invasions in fiction
Short stories by Harry Turtledove
Works originally published in Analog Science Fiction and Fact